Fantastica Mania 2019 was a professional wrestling tour, scripted and co-produced by the Japanese New Japan Pro-Wrestling (NJPW) promotion and the Mexican Consejo Mundial de Lucha Libre (CMLL) promotion. The tour started on January 11 and ran until January 21, 2019, with shows taking place in Osaka, Ehime, Kyoto, Gifu, Chiba and Tokyo.

The 2019 tour was the ninth time that NJPW and CMLL co-promoted shows in Japan under the Fantastica Mania name. With a total of eight shows scheduled, the tour tied the 2018 tour as the longest in Fantastica Mania history at that point in time. The four initial shows featured six matches each night, while the four latter shows featured seven. Select events were shown on Fighting TV Samurai and TV Asahi, or live on NJPW World with subsequent video-on-demand options.

Background
The 2019 Fantastica Mania tour was the ninth year in a row where Japanese wrestling promotion New Japan Pro-Wrestling (NJPW) promoted a series of shows with their Mexican partner Consejo Mundial de Lucha Libre (CMLL). Due to the co-promotional nature of the shows, they rarely featured any development in ongoing NJPW or CMLL storylines, opting instead to focus on inter-promotional matches. The Fantastica Mania shows featured various professional wrestling matches planned out by CMLL and NJPW, with some wrestlers involved in scripted feuds. The wrestlers portray either heels (referred to as rudos in Mexico, those that play the part of the "bad guys") or faces (técnicos in Mexico, the "good guy" characters) as they perform.

For the 2019 tour El Desperado, Sho and Yoh all competed under the ring personas they used during their training excursions with CMLL. El Desperado reprised his role as Namajague, CMLL's version of the Japanese folklore demon Namahage. Sho and Yoh, collectively known as Roppongi 3K, worked under the names Raijin and Fujin respectively.

Highlighted matches on the tour include Carístico – a técnico – teaming with rudos in various relevos increíbles tag matches, as well as the four-team CMLL Family Tag Tournament, with the winners facing the winners of last year's CMLL Brothers Tag Tournament, Los Guerreros Laguneros (Último Guerrero and Gran Guerrero). The January 20 show was the only show to feature a championship match, as La Nueva Generación Dinamita (Sansón, Cuatrero and Forastero) defended the Mexican National Trios Championship against Atlantis, Titán and Ángel de Oro. The 2019 tour also featured the in-ring debut of Atlantis Jr., the son of Atlantis, working every show on the tour.

The January 18 show hosted a memorial match in honor of Mexican wrestler Black Cat, who died of a heart attack on January 28, 2006. In this match, the team of Satoshi Kojima, Toa Henare, Raijin and Fujin defeated Los Ingobernables (Terrible, Tetsuya Naito, Bushi and Shingo Takagi). In the tour's last night, on January 21, the characters from the Japanese movie "My Dad is a Heel Wrestler" squared off in a special tag team match, with the team of Dragon George (Kazuchika Okada) and SweetGorilla Maruyama (Togi Makabe) defeating the team of Gokiburi Mask (Hiroshi Tanahashi) and Ginbae Mask (Ryusuke Taguchi).

Results

January 11

January 12

January 13

January 14

January 16

January 18

January 20

January 21

See also
2019 in professional wrestling

References

2019 in Tokyo
2019 in professional wrestling
January 2019 events in Japan
2019